Craighead Diocesan School is a state-integrated Anglican girls day and boarding school in Highfield, Timaru, New Zealand. It is the only Anglican-affiliated school in South Canterbury.

History

The school was founded in 1911 as Craighead School by Dunedin sisters Eleanor, Fanny, Elizabeth, and Anna Shand. The school's name comes from the house which was its first building, built in 1875 in the then-countryside outside Timaru. The house was named Craighead in 1890 by new owner Henry Le Cren, after his brother-in-law's Scottish castle. The Shand sisters purchased the house in 1910. After 15 years of teaching, the sisters retired, and the running of the school was taken over by the Anglican Church. In 1981, the then-private school was integrated into the state system. From an initial roll of 11 day students and six boarders, the school has grown to a maximum role of 380 as of 2011.

Notable alumnae

 Paddy Bassett – Agricultural Scientist
 Natalie Rooney – Sports Shooter

References

School website: History
Stuff.co.nz Centenary article
Stuff.co.nz Roll increase article

Boarding schools in New Zealand
Timaru
Educational institutions established in 1911
Girls' schools in New Zealand
Anglican schools in New Zealand
Secondary schools in Canterbury, New Zealand
1911 establishments in New Zealand